Route 74 is a state highway in Connecticut in the eastern part of the Greater Hartford area. It runs from Route 194 in South Windsor to US 44 in Ashford, going through the towns of Ellington, Vernon, Tolland, and Willington. East of its junction with I-84, it becomes a rural collector road.

Route description
Route 74 begins at an intersection with Route 194 in South Windsor and proceeds northeastward into the southwestern part of Ellington. In Ellington, it continues northeastward and then loops southeastward into Vernon. In Vernon, Route 74 becomes Windsorville Road and continues to a concurrency with Route 83 through the west end of the village of Rockville. When Route 83 turns to the north at West Street, Route 74 continues eastward towards Tolland. In Tolland, Route 74 continues east through town, with a brief concurrency with Route 30. Just prior to the Willington town line, it crosses I-84. In Willington, Route 74 continues eastward, with a brief concurrency with Route 320 in the center of town, and continues into Ashford. In Ashford, Route 74 continues southeastward to its terminus at an intersection with US 44.

History
The eastern half of modern Route 74 (east of Tolland center) was originally laid out as a turnpike in 1809 known as the Tolland County Turnpike. The turnpike ran from Ellington center, through Tolland and Willington, to the village of West Ashford, ending at the Boston Turnpike. The turnpike corporation collected tolls until 1834 when the corporation was dissolved.
In 1922, the turnpike route between Tollland and West Ashford and the road between Rockville and Tolland was designated as State Highway 107. Route 74 was commissioned in the 1932 state highway renumbering from old Highway 107 and ran from Route 83 in Rockville to US 44 (then Route 101) in Ashford. In 1948, the section from I-84 in Tolland to US 44 was transferred to US 44, which had been relocated to the new Wilbur Cross Highway between Manchester and Tolland. This change was reversed on December 1, 1982 with the connection of Interstate 84 with I-384 and the southward rerouting of US 44 to its original surface route. In 1963, Route 74 was extended west to the intersection of Routes 30 and 194 and Buckland Road in South Windsor center. In 1993, for safety reasons, the western terminus was moved slightly north to its current location.

Junction list

References

External links

074
Transportation in Hartford County, Connecticut
Transportation in Tolland County, Connecticut
Transportation in Windham County, Connecticut
U.S. Route 44